The Battle of Molodi (Russian: Би́тва при Мóлодях) was one of the key battles of Ivan the Terrible's reign. The Crimeans had burned Moscow the previous year, but this time they were thoroughly defeated. 

While the Tsardom of Russia was involved in the Livonian War, the Crimean khan hoped to make profit from the weakness of its southern borders. In the course of three expeditions, Devlet I Giray devastated South Russia and even sacked and set Moscow to fire in 1571. On 26 July 1572 the huge horde of the khan, equipped with cannons and reinforced by Turkish janissaries, crossed the Oka River near Serpukhov, decimated the Russian vanguard of 200 men, and advanced towards Moscow in order to pillage it once again. Little did they know, however, that the Russians had prepared for the new invasion, setting up innovative fortifications just beyond the Oka.

The Russian forces, variously estimated at between 23,000–25,000 men, were placed under the supreme command of Prince Mikhail Vorotynsky. Prince Repnin led the left flank, while the right flank was commanded by Prince Odoevsky. On 30 July the armies clashed near the Lopasnya River without so much as a prior reconnaissance. The fighting continued for several days, reaching its peak on 8 August. The large amount of close-in fighting made the Tatars' famed skill in archery quite useless: the battle was fought principally with sabers and spears. Artillery and arquebuses were also used by the Russians to great effect. The outcome was decided by Prince Khvorostinin who bypassed the horde with his gulyay-gorod (гуляй-город) mobile fortifications and infiltrated into the rear.

After the battle, only 20,000 Tatar horsemen returned to the Crimea, while the khan left his tent and banner on the battlefield and barely managed to escape alive. The battle claimed the lives of his sons and a grandson.

Based on contemporary documents, the Russian forces were as follows:Документы о сражении при Молодях // Исторический архив, № 4. 1959

Contemporary chronicles give very large and unreliable figures when talking about the Tatar army. The Novgorod Second Chronicle gives its strength as 120,000 and the Moscow Chronicle about 150 thousand. According to modern Russian historians, the khan's army most likely numbered 40,000-60,000, of which two-thirds were the Crimean army proper, and the rest Nogai, Circassians, and janissaries sent by the Ottoman Sultan.Пенской В. В. Сражение при Молодях 28 июля — 3 августа 1572 г // История военного дела: исследования и источники. — СПб., 2012. — Т. 2. — С. 156. — ISSN 2308-4286.

Sources

External links
 http://www.hrono.ru/sobyt/1500sob/molod.html
 http://www.kulichki.com/moshkow/HISTORY/ANDREEW_A_R/krym_history.txt#45
 http://www.magister.msk.ru/library/history/karamzin/kar09_03.htm 
 http://www.vostlit.info/Texts/Dokumenty/Russ/XVI/1560-1580/Schlacht_Molodi/text.htm
 http://www.xenophon-mil.org/rushistory/battles/ivanbook.htm

Molodi
Molodi
Molodi
Ivan the Terrible
1572 in Russia
Molodi
16th-century military history of Russia
1572 in the Ottoman Empire
Molodi